Lachenaie was an off-island suburb of Montreal, in southwestern Quebec, Canada on the Rivière des Mille-Îles. It is now part of the city of Terrebonne, and is in the Regional County Municipality of Les Moulins. In 2001, the population was 21,709.

Former municipalities in Quebec
Communities in Lanaudière
Terrebonne, Quebec
Populated places disestablished in 2001
2001 disestablishments in Quebec